Katamatite is a town in Victoria, Australia about 46 kilometres north east of Shepparton.
 
Katamatite is located in the Murray Valley irrigation area. Township buildings were erected in 1877 and the Post Office opened on 1 December 1877. The townships name is said to be derived from a question, specifically "Kate, am I tight?"

The town has an Australian rules football team competing in the Picola & District Football League. The team received publicity and notoriety back in 1925, when they defeated Wattville 78.19 (487) to 1.3 (9), in an attempt to win the minor premiership on percentage from Dookie.

Notable people
 Winner of the 1995 Stawell Gift : Glenn Crawford
 V.F.L/A.F.L. footballer Darren Flanigan played in the ruck in a losing 1989 A.F.L. Grand Final against Hawthorn. He played 130 A.F.L. games for Geelong (1981–91) kicking 50 goals and 8 games for St Kilda (1992) kicking 4 goals.
 V.F.L./A.F.L. footballer Gary Cameron played 26 games with Geelong (1987–90) kicking 18 goals. Gary went on to coach South Adelaide for (4) games in 2007.
 A.F.L. footballer Sam Wright played 136 games for North Melbourne, kicking 58 goals.
 Melbourne architect and academic Professor Marcus White, winner of the 2002 RAIA Haddon Travelling Scholarship, winner of the 2010 AIA Emerging Architect Prize (Victoria) and winner of the inaugural AIA National Emerging Architect Prize in 2011.
Identical twin brothers Rod and Don Kilgour are both local media personalities that grew up in Katamatite. Born in 1946, they attended Katamatite primary school and Numurkah High School. They undertook studies at Lee Murray Announcing College in Melbourne and after Don had 2 years at 3UL Warragul and Rod had 2 years at 3YB Warrnambool the twins worked at Radio 3SR Shepparton with Rod as the breakfast announcer and Don as sports editor, broadcasting football and commentating on all sports. After 5 years on Radio 3SR they became sports announcers on GMV6 Television and presented sports news for 18 years. Rod ran an office equipment business in Shepparton whilst Don Kilgour entered Victorian Parliament as the Member for Shepparton from 1991 until 2002. Both twins were involved in sport and the community. Don was awarded an OAM in 2018 for service to the community and was inducted into the City of Greater Shepparton Sports Hall of Fame for his contribution to sports promotion.
The O'Kane family are well known within Katamatite for their sporting prowess. Eileen O’Kane won 2 Victorian Country Week Ladies Singles championships in 1936 and 1938 making her the top player in country Victoria. Pat O’Kane was a long term tennis champion who won 8 Victorian Men's Singles Championships between 1948 and 1961. Brendan (Curley) O’Kane trained 2 sheep dogs to win the National Championship.  Yarramine Whiskey won the title in 1960 and Moreland's Lou in 1972. Paul O’Kane also trained a National Champion when O’Kanes Joshua won the title.

• A Katamatite resident holds the world record for longest drive with an indicator on without turning. The record stands at 65 km. The record was ceased when a roadside patron yelled "Blinker!" and the resident realised his error and new world record.

See also

 Katamatite Football Club

References

External links
Local History of Katamatite
History of Katamatite

Towns in Victoria (Australia)
Shire of Moira